Mithila Palkar (born 11 January 1993) is an Indian actress known for her characters in the TV series Girl in the City and Netflix's Little Things. She rose to prominence in March 2016 with her Marathi version of the "cup song". Palkar made her acting debut in 2014 in the Marathi language short film Majha Honeymoon. Her first Bollywood film was Nikkhil Advani's Katti Batti. She appeared as a lead in the 2018 film Karwaan.

Early life
Palkar was born on 11 January 1993 into a Marathi family. She initially lived in Vasai with her parents but she and her sister later moved to live in Dadar with her maternal grandparents due to inconveniences of daily commute. She comes from a family with no actors, and her grandfather initially did not approve of her decision to act. Her sister holds a PhD in Neuroscience and lives in Los Angeles. Palkar first acted while in Class VII in an inter-school drama competition. She admits being a "nerd" but was always active in dramatics, dancing and singing during her school days at IES's Modern English School, Dadar. She pursued science in higher secondary but chose to pursue a Bachelors of Mass Media (BMM) at MMK College, Bandra, after that to be involved with films and theatre. After graduating in 2013, Palkar gave her first audition to Quasar Padamsee of Quasar Theatre Productions (QTP). The audition did not get her the role but Quasar gave her a job backstage, managing their theatre festival, Thespo. Palkar has previously trained in Hindustani classical music (by the Marathi singer Varsha Bhave), in Kathak, and took a crash course in acting at the Stella Adler Studio of Acting in Los Angeles.

Career
Palkar made her acting debut in the 2014 Marathi short film Majha Honeymoon, which was showcased at the 16th Mumbai International Film Festival. Her first success in the Indian film industry was in June 2014, when she successfully auditioned for the role of Imran Khan's sister in Katti Batti. The film did not do well but she was noticed and received opportunities to act in advertisements of Maggi, Tata Tea and Zomato.

Palkar grew popular overnight in March 2016 with her version of the "cup song", inspired by Anna Kendrick's cup song from Pitch Perfect. The video featured her performing the popular Marathi song Hi Chal Turu Turu (sung originally by Jaywant Kulkarni) in the cup song style. Mithila's cup song went viral on YouTube with more than 6 million views. She had previously attempted another version of the cup song, performing "Can't Take My Eyes Off You" and receiving more than 22,000 views. She later sang a song called "Maharashtra Desha" in association with Bharatiya Digital Party (BhaDiPa), which was released on 1 May 2016 on YouTube on the occasion of Maharashtra Day.

Meanwhile, Dhruv Sehgal, who met Palkar at Thespo (QTP's annual theatre festival), asked her to audition for Filter Copy's new satire show on YouTube called News Darshan. She not only succeeded in that audition but also went on to do her first web series called Girl in the City in 2016 for Bindass and a number of YouTube videos for Pocket Aces. One of these is a web series called Little Things alongside Sehgal since 2017, which has achieved a lot of popularity and was also published as a book by Penguin Random House. Netflix purchased the franchise of Little Things in 2018 and its second season premiered on Netflix on 5 October 2018. The third season of Little Things premiered on 9 November 2019. The fourth and final season of Little Things premiered on 15 October 2021.

In 2017, she appeared in two plays, Tunni Ki Kahani (a children's musical) and Aaj Rang Hai (a Hindustani musical) with the theatre group called Aarambh. Later that year, Palkar made her debut in Marathi cinema with the film Muramba, alongside Amey Wagh. 2018 saw Palkar playing her first lead role in a Hindi film called Karwaan, alongside Irrfan Khan, Dulquer Salmaan and Kriti Kharbanda. The film released on 3 August 2018.

In 2019, she acted in Chopsticks, a Netflix original film, directed by Sachin Yardi. In the film, she played role of an under-confident girl named Nirma (after the washing powder brand) whose life changes when she meets a con man, played by Abhay Deol. She later acted with Dhruv Sehgal in Taco Bell's digital campaign for their new product Quesalupa (a crossover between a chalupa and a quesadilla that is filled with cheese) titled #TheCheesyPull. Palkar's next project was the Netflix film Tribhanga, directed by Renuka Shahane, featuring Tanvi Azmi and Kajol. The film began shooting in October 2019.

Media 
Forbes India named Palkar in their Forbes 30 Under 30 list of young achievers in February 2018.

Filmography

Films

Web series

Theatre

Awards

References

External links

 
 

1993 births
Living people
Actresses from Mumbai
Marathi actors
Indian film actresses
21st-century Indian actresses
Actresses in Hindi cinema
Actresses in Marathi cinema
Actresses in Telugu cinema
Indian television actresses
University of Mumbai alumni